"I Used to Be Color Blind" is a popular song written by Irving Berlin for the 1938 film Carefree, where it was introduced by Fred Astaire. The Astaire recording was very popular in 1938.

Notable recordings
Fred Astaire recorded the song again for his album The Astaire Story (1952)
Tony Bennett - Life Is Beautiful (1975)
Ella Fitzgerald - Ella Fitzgerald Sings the Irving Berlin Songbook (1958)
Anita O'Day - Pick Yourself Up with Anita O'Day (1957)

References

Songs written by Irving Berlin
Fred Astaire songs
Ella Fitzgerald songs
1937 songs
Mildred Bailey songs